ABM (standing for Anti-Ballistic Missile) is a clone of Atari, Inc.'s Missile Command arcade game for the 32K Apple II. It was programmed by Silas Warner and published by Muse Software in 1980, the same year as Missile Command.

Gameplay
In ABM the player uses anti-ballistic missiles to defend six cities along the East Coast against incoming ICBMs.

Reception
Bruce Webster reviewed ABM in The Space Gamer No. 43. Webster wrote that "In the end, the question is whether or not you want to spend the money for another arcade game. If so, then I can recommend ABM to you with the above caveats."

Reviews
Moves #58, p30

References

External links
Softalk review
Review in Creative Computing
Review in Byte
Review in Personal Computer World
Review in Creative Computing
Review in SoftSide
ABM disassembly and analysis

1980 video games
Apple II games
Apple II-only games
Muse Software games
Shoot 'em ups
Video game clones
Video games about nuclear war and weapons
Video games developed in the United States